This is a list of cars produced by Reynard Motorsports.

References 

Reynard
Reynard Motorsport vehicles